Neurogomphus zambeziensis is a species of dragonfly in the family Gomphidae. It is found in Botswana, Mozambique, Namibia, South Africa, Zambia, Zimbabwe, and possibly Tanzania. Its natural habitats are subtropical or tropical moist lowland forests, subtropical or tropical dry shrubland, subtropical or tropical moist shrubland, and rivers.

References

Gomphidae
Taxonomy articles created by Polbot